The American Payroll Association (APA) is a professional association for individuals responsible for processing company payrolls. The Association conducts payroll training courses and seminars on a yearly basis and publishes a library of payroll resource texts and newsletters. The APA has approximately 21,000 members, 121 APA-affiliated local chapters, and registered lobbyists based in Washington, D.C.

The APA was founded in 1982 and is headquartered in San Antonio, Texas with additional offices in Las Vegas and Washington, D.C. In addition, the APA owns and operates two learning centers, the San Antonio Learning Center and MEET Las Vegas. Both Learning Centers offer payroll training utilizing the latest technology and computer networking capabilities.

Education 
The biggest of APA's educational offerings is its annual Congress. The event has more than 100 payroll and AP related workshops, guest speakers including government officials and industry experts, and a payroll and AP exhibit hall. The Association also publishes a complete library of resource texts and newsletters for payroll.

They offer comprehensive education for payroll professionals, including a full slate of training courses and conferences from Payroll 101 to Advance and/or Strategic Payroll. Training is available in a variety of formats including live classroom training, eLearning, virtual classrooms, webinars and webinars on demand.

They also offer a comprehensive library of compliance resources, which is produced by the Association's experienced team of payroll and employment law experts. Publications are issued in many media, including printed text, e-book, magazine, e-magazine, newsletter, e-newsletter, and CD.

Conferences 
The APA holds an annual Congress each May as well as smaller conferences throughout the year. Individual state conferences are organized independently by the APA's chapters.

APA's national conferences include: 
 Annual Congress held in May is the APA's largest educational conference and features over 200 workshops and an expo hall.
 Fall Forum held in September focuses on advanced career leadership, process improvements, compliance issues, benchmarking, and payroll organization management.
 Educational Institutions Payroll Conference (EIPC) held in October focuses on compliance issues impacting payroll and tax professionals working in the higher education community.
 Capital Summit held in March focuses on new and still-developing payroll legislative and regulatory issues that affect payroll operations.

Government Relations 
The APA participates in lobbying activities in Washington, D.C., and sponsors multiple member-lead committees called "Government Relations Task Force" committees. The committees cover areas such as the following: Child Support & Other Garnishments, Federal Tax Forms & Publications, Immigration, Payroll Cards, SSA Wage Reporting, and Unemployment Insurance. The purpose of these committees is to communicate the concerns of the payroll community to legislative and executive branches of government and to find ways for employers to meet their requirements under law and support government objectives, while minimizing administrative burden and cost for employers, government, and individual taxpayers.

In May 2008, IRS Commissioner Douglas H Shulman delivered an address to the attendees of the APA's 2008 Congress highlighting the importance of the relationship between the IRS and APA, stating, "APA has a long history of providing valuable advice and feedback to the IRS as we have implemented a number of important tax laws that have played a prominent role in the economic development of our nation."

Further example of the APA's involvement with various government bodies is the APA's contributions to publications such as the IRS/SSA Reporter. The APA's Government Relations team frequently submits articles to the quarterly publication released by the IRS. The most recent Fall 2015 edition of the publication features two articles submitted by the APA. The first titled "APA Seminar/Webinar: Year-end compliance and new rules for 2016" details the Preparing for Year-End seminar and webinar course offered by the APA. The second article, "Effectively planning for the taxation of awards and prizes", details what payroll professionals need to know about the financial impact that occurs when employers provides these incentives to employees.

Additionally, APA's Government Relations staff has received SSA's Public Service Award for its ongoing dedication to improving the quality of employer wage and tax reporting and the IRS's Excellence in Partnering Award for its collaboration on clarifying employers' responsibilities and helping IRS educate employers. At IRS, the APA is a founding member of the Information Reporting Program Advisory Committee and also has had representation on the IRS Advisory Council and the Electronic Tax Administration Advisory Committee.

Publications and Services 
PAYTECH magazine is the APA's largest monthly publication and covers payroll management system, technology, professional development, and trends that are affecting the payroll industry.

The association also produces general and topic-focused newsletters including:
 PayState Update: This bi-weekly e-newsletter focuses exclusively on state and local payroll compliance news and issues
 PAYTECHonline: This monthly ezine highlights APA events, resources, and feature articles from PAYTECH. 
 Payroll Currently: A monthly newsletter that includes a compliance calendar and report from the APA's Government Relations team.
 Guide to Global Payroll Management: Free e-book available for download that details global payroll issues such as international benefits, wage and tax withholding, reporting requirements, and more.
In early 2014, the APA introduced the Pay News Now video news network. Subject matter experts record and post frequent video updates detailing the latest legislation happening that could impact payroll on federal, state, and local levels.

The APA website homepage is updated weekly with original reporting, providing news on legislative updates,  educational offerings coming up, and various payroll topics.

Professional Certification 
Payroll certification verifies a specified level of knowledge, skills and abilities in the payroll profession. APA offers two levels of professional certification—the Fundamental Payroll Certification (FPC) and the Certified Payroll Professional (CPP).

National Payroll Week 
Every year the American Payroll Association hosts National Payroll Week, a national celebration and public awareness campaign. National Payroll Week (or NPW) is held annually during week of Labor Day, and celebrates the hard work by America's 150 million wage earners and the payroll professionals who pay them.  Together, through the payroll withholding system, they contribute, collect, report and deposit approximately $2.08 trillion (68%) of the annual revenue of the US Treasury.

Global Payroll Management Institute 
In February 2015 the APA launched the Global Payroll Management Institute (GPMI). It is currently a free service that provides subscribers with an online magazine, white papers, and webinars.

American Accounts Payable Association 
In 2008, the APA launched a sister association, the American Accounts Payable Association (AAPA). AAPA provides training, publications, and other resources to help AP professionals implement strategies and best practices, while maintaining compliance with state and federal laws and regulations. The AAPA was dissolved in 2014 and absorbed into the American Payroll Association.

References

External links 
 

Professional associations based in the United States
Payroll